GALK2 may refer to:
N-acetylgalactosamine kinase, an enzyme
Galactokinase, an enzyme